Tor is a surname. Notable people with the surname include:

George Tor (born 1989), Nigerian association football player
Guilhem de la Tor (fl. 1216–1233), French jongleur-troubadour
Margaret Tor-Thompson ( 1962–2007), Liberian politician
Tamy Ben-Tor (born 1975), Israeli visual artist